Birgit "Bibbi" Gullbrandsson (married name Sandén, 22 August 1916 – 6 January 2006), was a Swedish tennis player. She won the women's Swedish Open in 1954.

Tennis career
Beginning in 1938 when she was 22, Bibbi Gullbrandsson won 49 Swedish national championships, 16 in singles. She often partnered in doubles with Mary Lagerborg.

Like many others, she lost several years of international competitive opportunities to World War II. After the war, she won the women's Swedish Open in 1954, defeating Milly Vagn-Nielsen in straight sets, and in 1955, when she was 39, she won the German Tennis Championship.

Personal life
Gullbrandsson was born in Kalmar. She lived in Stockholm for most of her life, and worked in cartography.

References

Sources
 Mats Hasselqvist, Salkbollen, 2006, no. 1. 
 Göran Tholerus, Ett sekel av svensk tennis, centennial celebration volume, Stockholm: Kungliga lawn tennis klubben, 1996, .

External links
 "Bibbi Gullbrandsson (SWE)", Ladies' singles, Wimbledon.com (pdf)
 "Bibbi Gullbrandsson (SWE)", Ladies' doubles, Wimbledon.com (pdf)
 "Bibbi Gullbrandsson (SWE)", Mixed doubles, Wimbledon.com (pdf)

Swedish female tennis players
1916 births
2006 deaths